Monica Braw (born 24 May 1945 in Härnösand), is a Swedish author and an international reporter.

Bibliography

Fiction
 Någonannanstans (Somewhere Else)(short stories) Bonniers 1978
 Innan jag dog (Before I Died) (novel). Bonniers 1980
 Överlevarna (The Survivors) (novel). Bonniers 1982 (pocket Bonniers 1985. In German  Wir sind *  * die Angst der Welt. Fischer Taschenbuch Verlag  Frankfurt am Main 1984)
 Hjärtlandet (Heartland) (short stories) Bonniers 1984
 Hemort:Tokyo (Domicile: Tokyo) (tales) Bonniers 1988
 Främling. En svensk i fjärran land (Stranger. A Swede in far-off land) (novel) Bonniers 2002
 Hiroshima överlever (Hiroshima Survives) (novel, revis. Överlevarna) Orienta 2005

Fact
 Jorden är vårt hem.
 Edita Morris och hennes tid (Gidlunds 2018)
 Kuolla kuin kärpäset (Die like flies). Rapport från Bangladesh. Report from Bangladesh. With Juhani Lompolo. Otava, Helsingfors 1971
 Kvinna i Kina. LT 1973. (In Finnish Neljä vuorta - naisen asema uudessa Kiinassa.  Tammi 1973.) (Woman in China)
 Den gömda solen. En bok om Japan och japanska kvinnor. With Hiroe Gunnarsson. LT 1978. (In German Frauen in Japan. Zwischen Tradition und Aufbruch. Fischer  Taschenbuchverlag. Frankfurt am Main 1982) (The Hidden Sun. About Japan and Japanese women)
 Pitkä matka itään (Den långa resan österut)  (The Long Journey East) With Juhani   Lompolo. Kirjayhtymä Helsingfors 1985
 The Atomic Bomb Suppressed. American Censorship in Japan 1945–1949.  (Dissertation in History at the University of Lund). Liber 1986  (Den censurerade atombomben. Brevskolan och TBV 1985 förkortad version. In Japanese Ken’etsu. Kinji sareta genbaku hodo. Jiji Tsushinsha Tokyo 1988 . Revised as The Atomic Bomb Suppressed. American Censorship in Occupied  Japan. M.E.Sharpe Armonk N.Y. USA 1991
 Fakta om Japan. Bredvidläsningsbok för mellanstadiet. (Facts about Japan. 4-7 grade school book) Almqvist & Wiksell Läromedel 1991
 Japanska tecken i tiden. (Japanese Signs of the Times - Japanese ways of writing) Folkens museum Etnografiska (The National Ethnographic Museum) 1994
 Trendbrott i japansk politik. (Break of Trends in Japanese Politics) Utrikespolitiska  Institutet (Swedish Institute of Foreign Policy) 1994
 Japan. Bredvidläsningsbok för högstadiet. (Schoolbook for 8-12 grade) Natur & Kultur 1996
 Japanskt ABC. Orientens mystik i dagsljus. (Japanese ABC) With Juhani Lompolo.    Orienta 1997
 Jättens rötter. Japan - sömnigt samurajvälde blir ekonomisk supermakt. (The Roots of the Giant. From Sleepy Samurai Nation to Economic Superpower)  With Aimé  Humbert. Orienta 1999
 Från Hokusai till Dragon Ball (From Hokusai to Dragon Ball) Carlson förlag 2004.
 Samurajerna (The Samurai) With Juhani Lompolo. Atlantis förlag 2006a
 Trollsländans land – Japans historia (Land of the Dragonfly – History of Japan), Atlantis 2010,

References

External links
 Monica Braw's web site, archived

1945 births
Living people
People from Härnösand
Swedish women novelists
Writers from Ångermanland
Swedish women short story writers
Swedish short story writers